Kanhai Chitrakar was an Indian artist and painter, credited with the revival of the heritage painting discipline of Kanhai Art, a method of painting where gold powder, gold leaves and gem stones are used.

Kanhai Chitrakar was born in Vrindavan, in Mathura district, in the Indian state of Uttar Pradesh. His career started as an art director for the renowned filmmaker Guru Dutt, but later he returned to Vrindavan where he set up his studio, working in Kanhai art. The studio have since grown to become Kanhai Art Works where he and his two sons, Krishn Kanhai and Govind Kanhai, worked producing art works. Krishna is a recipient of the Padma Shri award and Gobind has received the Uttar Pradesh State Ratna Award.

A recipient of the AISCCON lifetime achievement award and the Uttar Pradesh Ratna award, Chitrakar was honored by the Government of India, in 2000, with the fourth highest Indian civilian award of Padma Shri. He died on 14 August 2013.

References

Indian male painters
Year of birth missing
2013 deaths
20th-century Indian painters
People from Mathura district
Recipients of the Padma Shri in arts
Painters from West Bengal
20th-century Indian male artists